The 2000 Cornell Big Red football team was an American football team that represented Cornell University during the 2000 NCAA Division I-AA football season. Cornell finished second in the Ivy League. 

In its third and final season under head coach Pete Mangurian, the team compiled a 5–5 record and was outscored 334 to 264. Joe Splendorio and Dan Weyandt were team captains. 

Cornell's 5–2 conference record placed second in the Ivy League standings. Despite their winning record, the Big Red were outscored 238 to 217 by Ivy opponents.

Cornell played its home games at Schoellkopf Field in Ithaca, New York.

Schedule

Roster

References

Cornell
Cornell Big Red football seasons
Cornell Big Red football